Albert Thibaudet (1 April 1874 in Tournus, Saône-et-Loire – 16 April 1936 in Geneva) was a French essayist and literary critic.  A former student of Henri Bergson, he was a professor of Jean Rousset.  He taught at the University of Geneva, and was the co-founder of the Geneva School of literary criticism. He was succeeded in his post by Marcel Raymond.

Career
Thibaudet's reputation increased through 1920s and 1930s, in part for his regular articles in the Nouvelle Revue Française which he wrote from 1912 until his death, as well as for his numerous books.

In 1928, the philosopher Lucien Lévy-Bruhl sponsored him to participate in the first of the Cours universitaires de Davos, international meetings of intellectuals at Davos, Switzerland.

In 2008, the Thucydides Centre (a research institute of the Paris Panthéon-Assas University) inaugurated the "Albert Thibaudet Prize", awarded to a French-language writer on international relations.

Works
La Campagne avec Thucydide, 1922 (on Thucydides)
 Gustave Flaubert, 1922, republished, 1936
Le Bergsonisme, 1923 (on Henri Bergson)
La république des professeurs, B. Grasset, Paris 1927
Physiologie de la critique, 1930
Les idées politiques en France, 1931
Histoire de la littérature française - de 1789 à nos jours, 1936

References

1874 births
1936 deaths
People from Tournus
French literary critics
French essayists
Lycée Henri-IV alumni
French male essayists